Oleksiy Anatoliovych Tymchenko (born 9 June 1985 in village Pantaziivka, Kirovohrad Oblast) is a Ukrainian football midfielder currently playing for Ukrainian Second League club Dynamo Khmelnytskyi.

Club history
Oleksiy Tymchenko began his football career in CYSS Ordzhonikidze in Ordzhonikidze. He signed with FC Kremin Kremenchuk during 2007 summer transfer window.

Career statistics

References

External links
  Profile – Official Kremin site
  FC Kremin Kremenchuk Squad on the PFL website
  Profile on the FFU website

1985 births
Living people
FC Kremin Kremenchuk players
FC CSKA Kyiv players
FC Dynamo Khmelnytskyi players
Ukrainian footballers
Association football midfielders